J.N. Ganesh is an Indian politician from the state of Karnataka. He is the current MLA for Kampli representing Congress. He is known to be peoples leader.

Biography 
Born to Corporator J.N. Venkobba in Hosur, Ballari, he grew up in a farmer's family. He completed 12th Boards and went to college. He started farming and became popular by helping people. He believed in simple living and was a righteous man. An absolute hard working man who is respected by his community for his generous work towards farmers.

He joined congress, his role model is sir siddaramaiah. Helped him to boost enrollment. In 2013, Afterwards, Ganesh successfully sought a ticket from Congress for 2013 elections, and contested as an Independent. He lost to incumbent MLA T. H. Suresh Babu by 36,000 Votes. In 2018, however, he won the Kampli seat, defeating Babu by 5000 votes on a Congress ticket.

References

Year of birth missing (living people)
Living people
Karnataka MLAs 2018–2023
Indian National Congress politicians from Karnataka